Dwight Tillery is an American politician of the Democratic Party who is active in local politics of Cincinnati, Ohio and served as the city's mayor from 1991 to 1993.

Tillery grew up in the city's West End and attended the University of Cincinnati in the 1960s, where he helped found the university's United Black Association and graduated with a degree in political science. He also holds a J.D. degree from the University of Michigan Law School.

Tillery served as mayor of Cincinnati from 1991 to 1993, the city's second African-American mayor. He briefly ran for the Democratic nomination for Congress in 1992 before dropping out of the race in order to focus on his mayoral duties. He was a member of the Cincinnati City Council for many years, until 1998, when term limits forced his retirement. He remains active in the Democratic Party, most notably working on public health issues and supporting the election campaigns of African American candidates.

In 2004 Tillery founded the nonprofit organization  The Center for Closing the Health Gap in Greater Cincinnati to actively engage local hospitals, social advocates, and health care leaders to combat higher rates of obesity, diabetes, heart disease, HIV and cancer occurring in vulnerable populations. Tillery retired from the organization on December 31, 2018.

References

Mayors of Cincinnati
African-American mayors in Ohio
Ohio Democrats
University of Cincinnati alumni
University of Michigan Law School alumni
Living people
Year of birth missing (living people)
21st-century African-American people